Northern State Teachers College may refer to:
Northern Michigan University, a public university in Marquette, Michigan
Northern State University, a public university in Aberdeen, South Dakota